Whalan is a surname, an anglicized variant of the Gaelic surname, Ó Faoláin, see page "Phelan" for more. Notable people with this surname include:

Elka Whalan (born 1981), Australian swimmer
Paul Whalan
Thomas Whalan

Anglicised Irish-language surnames